Bridgeport station is a SEPTA rapid transit station in Bridgeport, Pennsylvania. It serves the Norristown High Speed Line (Route 100). The station is located on Sixth Street near DeKalb Street (US 202), although SEPTA's official website gives the address as being near 5th and Merion Streets. All trains stop at Bridgeport.

Station layout

History
The station opened in 1912 as part of the Philadelphia and Western Railroad branch line to Norristown.

References

External links

5th Street entrance from Google Maps Street View

SEPTA Norristown High Speed Line stations
Railway stations in the United States opened in 1912